Greatest Hits is the first compilation album by Haitian rapper Wyclef Jean, released on October 7, 2003. Released just a month prior to his fourth studio album, The Preacher's Son, Greatest Hits contains singles taken from Jean's first three studio albums: The Carnival, The Ecleftic: 2 Sides II a Book and Masquerade, as well as other fan-favourite tracks from those albums, alongside two-newly recorded tracks: "Ghetto Religion", a collaboration with R. Kelly, and "Hey Girl". The album also contains "No Woman, No Cry", a track taken from The Fugees' second studio album, The Score. Notably, Greatest Hits would be Jean's last release on Columbia Records until Carnival Vol. II: Memoirs of an Immigrant in 2007.

A deluxe edition of the album, released in the UK and Australia, contains a bonus disc with remixes of some of Wyclef's biggest hits, including collaborations with Canibus, R. Kelly, Xzibit, King Yellowman and Beenie Man. Although no singles were officially released from the album, "Ghetto Religion" was serviced as a US-radio only airplay single in September 2003. Notably, "Pussycat", which samples the original by Tom Jones, is the only single from the first three albums to omitted from the tracklisting. The US edition of the album removes a number of notable singles, and shortens the tracklisting by four tracks. "Diallo" and "Something About Mary" from The Ecleftic are included on this version.

Track listing

Chart performance

References

2003 greatest hits albums
Wyclef Jean albums
Albums produced by R. Kelly
Albums produced by Wyclef Jean